The War Damage Act 1965 is an Act of United Kingdom Parliament which exempts the Crown from liability in respect of damage to, or destruction of, property caused by acts lawfully done by the Crown during, or in contemplation of the outbreak of, a war in which it is engaged. Enacted in the aftermath of the prominent case Burmah Oil Co. v Lord Advocate, it is a rare piece of British legislation with retroactive effect.

Ordinances
The first clause of the War Damage Act 1965:

A second clause was repealed in 1995. It read:

References

External links

United Kingdom Acts of Parliament 1965
United Kingdom military law
1965 in military history